State of the Art is an album by organist Jimmy McGriff recorded in 1985 and released on the Milestone label.

Track listing
All compositions by Jimmy McGriff except where noted
 "Headbender" – 5:23
 "Stormy Weather" (Harold Arlen, Ted Koehler) – 4:26
 "Cheesesteak" – 5:57
 "Don't Ever Doubt Me" (Jimmy McGriff, Thornell Schwartz) – 4:18
 "New Wave Blues" – 6:15
 "Slow Grindin'" – 4:39
 "Hip Hop Bebop" (Lonnie Smith) – 6:28

Personnel
Jimmy McGriff – organ, keyboards, arranger
Lonnie Smith – synthesizer
Melvin Sparks – guitar, arranger
Stanley Banks – electric bass (tracks 1, 4 & 6)
Bernard Davis (tracks 1, 4 & 6), Jesse "Cheese" Hameen (track 3) − drums

References

Milestone Records albums
Jimmy McGriff albums
1985 albums
Albums produced by Bob Porter (record producer)